1-Chloro-1,2,2,2-tetrafluoroethane, C2HClF4, is a hydrochlorofluorocarbon used as a component in refrigerants offered as replacements for chlorofluorocarbons. HCFC-124 is also used in gaseous fire suppression systems as a replacement for bromochlorocarbons.

References

Refrigerants
Hydrochlorofluorocarbons